Carcar, officially the City of Carcar, is a 5th class component city in the province of Cebu, Philippines. According to the 2020 census, it has a population of 136,453 people.

Carcar City is bordered to the north by the town of San Fernando, to the west are the towns of Aloguinsan and Barili, to the east is the Cebu Strait, and to the south is the town of Sibonga.

Carcar lies within Metro Cebu area.

History
Carcar was known as "Sialo" since before the Spanish colonization. It became a municipality in 1599. Carcar is considered one of the oldest towns in Cebu, with its Spanish influence lasted more than 300 years ago.

Cityhood

On July 2007, the municipality of Carcar was converted into a component city of the province of Cebu after ratification of Republic Act 9436.

On November 18, 2008, Supreme Court ruled that the cityhood charters of Carcar and 15 other cities as unconstitutional as a result of a petition filed by the League of Cities of the Philippines. A year later, on December 22, Carcar and 15 other municipalities regained their status as cities again after the court reversed its November 18, 2008, ruling. On August 23, 2010, the court reinstated its ruling on November 18, 2008, causing Carcar and 15 cities to revert back to municipalities. Finally on February 15, 2011, Carcar and the other 15 municipalities regained their cityhood status.

In 2013, after a six year legal battle, the League of Cities of the Philippines acknowledged and recognized the cityhood of Carcar and 15 other cities on July 19, 2013.

Geography

Topography
The land is generally level with less than 18% slope comprising 78.7% of the total land area. Areas with slopes ranging from 18 to 50% cover 19.3% of the total land area and those over 50% slope comprise approximately 1.9%.

Soil type
The municipality has five dominant soil types namely: Faraon Clay, Steep Phase, the Lugo Clay, the Mandaue clay loam & the Hydrosol type.

Barangays

Carcar comprises 15 barangays:

Climate
The wet season occurs during the months of May to October and the dry season, from January to May.

Demographics

Economy

Tourism

 As a Heritage City of Cebu, Carcar contains various Spanish and American period structures. The Carcar plaza alone hosts several heritage structures, the Church of St. Catherine of Alexandria dominates the area. Within the complex various structures stand, including quaint houses and their distinctive architectural details.
 Surrounding the Rotunda and in the public market one will find the famous Carcar chicharon, lechon, ampao, bucarillo, gorgorias and puso – just some of the local delicacies.
 Guadalupe Mabugnao Mainit Hot Spring National Park
 Heritage Houses such as the Mercado Mansion
 Tuyom Beach – Beach Houses
 The Kabkaban Festival, which is the town's local festival in honor of St. Catherine of Alexandria. The name of the festival comes from the old name of the town, which was taken from the local term for the Oakleaf Fern (Aglaomorpha quercifolia) which is abundant in the town, even to this day. Celebrated from the November 23 to 25, it highlights the rich culture, faith, and musical history of Carcar.

Notable personalities

 Teofilo Camomot – founded the Congregation of Blessed Virgin Missionaries
 Sheryn Regis – singer

Gallery

References

Sources

External links

 [ Philippine Standard Geographic Code]

 
Cities in Cebu
Cities in Metro Cebu
Populated places established in 1599
1599 establishments in the Philippines
Component cities in the Philippines